Roger Mainwood (born 31 July 1953 in Canterbury, Kent; died 20 September 2018) was a British animator and film director. He is best known for his work on Heavy Metal (1981), The World of Peter Rabbit and Friends (1994), Stressed Eric (2000), Meg and Mog (2003) and Ethel & Ernest (2016). Ethel & Earnest was nominated for 'Best Animated Feature Film' in the 2017 30th European Film Awards.

Biography 
His father, Richard, worked for the Inner London Education Authority.

Mainwood assisted the Queen Elizabeth’s school in Faversham, where he was first received an education in the arts. He later joined the London College of Printing and the Royal College of Art. His short animated film Cage was shown at the 1977 London film festival. In 1979, he animated a film version of the song Autobahn by German band Kraftwerk. Mainwood later worked for TV Cartoons Ltd (TVC), and Halas and Batchelor studios.

In 1994, Mainwood released his first TV feature as a director, The World of Peter Rabbit and Friends. 22 years later he directed his first animation film Ethel & Ernest based on the graphic novel of illustrator Raymond Briggs.

Roger Mainwood died of cancer on September 2018. He was married to Valerie (nee) Jones, with whom he had two daughters, Naomi and Miriam.

See also 

 Lists of animated feature films

References

External links 
 
 

1953 births
2018 deaths
British animators
People from Canterbury
British animated film directors